Virginia's 28th Senate district is one of 40 districts in the Senate of Virginia. It has been represented by Republican Richard Stuart since 2008.

Geography
District 28 stretches from the far reaches of the D.C. metropolitan area to the Northern Neck, incorporating parts of Prince William, Stafford, Spotsylvania, King George, and Westmoreland Counties.

The district overlaps with Virginia's 1st, 7th, and 10th congressional districts, and with the 2nd, 13th, 28th, 31st, 40th, 50th, 51st, 54th, 87th, 88th, and 99th districts of the Virginia House of Delegates.

Recent election results

2019

2015

2011

Federal and statewide results in District 28

Historical results
All election results below took place prior to 2011 redistricting, and thus were under different district lines.

2007

2003

1999

1995

1991

1987

References

Virginia Senate districts
King George County, Virginia
Prince William County, Virginia
Spotsylvania County, Virginia
Stafford County, Virginia
Westmoreland County, Virginia